The Atlanta Film Festival (ATLFF) is an international film festival held in Atlanta, Georgia and operated by the Atlanta Film Society, a 501(c)(3) nonprofit organization. Started in 1976 and occurring every spring, the festival shows a diverse range of independent films, with special attention paid to women-directed films, LGBTQ films, Latin American films, Black films and films from the American Southeast. ATLFF is one of only a handful of festivals that are Academy Award-qualifying in all three short film categories.

History

Founding
In 1968, the Atlanta International Film Festival was launched, becoming Atlanta's first major film event. It operated until 1974 when the organizers were no longer able to finance the operation. Two years later, a group of independent filmmakers and artists established Independent Media Artists of Georgia, Etc. (IMAGE) as a 501(c)(3) nonprofit organization in 1976. The IMAGE Film & Video Center opened that year as the first media arts center in the state of Georgia, providing much-needed equipment access, networking, information dissemination, and support to local filmmakers. A year later, the inaugural Atlanta Independent Film & Video Festival launched on May 14, 1977 at the Piedmont Park Bathhouse.

Name Changes
In 1984, the organization truncated the name of the festival to the Atlanta Film and Video Festival, and again in 2002, to the Atlanta Film Festival. In 2015, the parent organization became known as the Atlanta Film Society.

Effects of the COVID-19 pandemic
In March 2020, ATLFF made the decision to postpone the 44th edition due to the COVID-19 pandemic. The original dates of April 30-May 10 were rescheduled to September 17–27. This will mark the first time in the organization's history that the event will take place beyond the spring or early summer months. The 2022 event had the festival back to its usual practice with many awards.

Academy Award Qualification
For decades, ATLFF has been an Academy Award-qualifying event for the Academy Award for Best Live Action Short Film and the Academy Award for Best Animated Short Film. After AMPAS changed the rules for the Academy Award for Best Documentary (Short Subject) qualification, ATLFF became Oscar-qualifying in all three short film categories in 2015. The winners of the Best Narrative Short Film, Best Animated Short Film and Best Documentary Short Film Jury Prizes go on to be eligible for the respective shortlists for their Oscar categories. Ray McKinnon's The Accountant won the Academy Award for Best Live Action Short Film in 2002 after qualifying at the 2001 Atlanta Film Festival.

IMAGE Film Awards Gala
On June 7, 2001, the organization launched the annual IMAGE Film Awards Gala as a separate event attached to the annual film festival. Recognizing individuals and organizations who have made outstanding contributions to building the state's film industry and community, the awards were named in honor of the organization's founding name. Robert Osborne of Turner Classic Movies hosted the first reception where founding IMAGE Executive Director Gayla Jamison, Georgia Governor Zell Miller, Academy Award-nominated filmmaker Gary Moss, and Crawford Communications were the inaugural honorees.

The IMAGE Film Awards Gala continued for eight years until 2008, when the Atlanta Film Society paused the program for over a decade. It returned again on April 3, 2019 at the Fox Theatre's Egyptian Ballroom attached to the 43rd annual ATLFF, where Georgia Attorney General Chris Carr, Actor/Musician/Producer Tip "T.I." Harris, Director Corporate Responsibility & Civic Affairs at Turner Broadcasting and Georgia Representative Betsy Holland, and "The Walking Dead" Executive Producer Tom Luse were honored.

Other IMAGE Film Award recipients include Dallas Austin, Ossie Davis, Ruby Dee, the Georgia Film Office, Diane Ladd, Spike Lee, Will Packer, Parker Posey, Burt Reynolds, Michael Stipe, Tyler Perry Studios, and Cicely Tyson.

Notable discoveries
Spike Lee may be considered ATLFF's first great filmmaker discovery. Lee made his first film, Last Hustle in Brooklyn, while a mass communications student at Morehouse College with the encouragement of his mentor, Dr. Herb Eichelberger, a co-founder of the Atlanta Film Society (then known as IMAGE). The festival was the first to screen the film, where it won a jury prize of $25. After winning the jury prize, Lee decided to pursue a career as a filmmaker. ATLFF also screened Joe's Bed-Stuy Barbershop: We Cut Heads, which won Lee a 1983 Student Academy Award. He was honored in 2005 with the inaugural Ossie Davis Award, in 2009 with a 20th-anniversary screening of Do The Right Thing, and in 2019 with the Originator Award.

When ATLFF revived its annual Screenplay Competition in 2008, Athens-native James Ponsoldt was among the inaugural winners. Ponsoldt later went on to serve as a mentor for the Screenwriter's Retreat (the main prize of the Screenplay Competition) and his film The Spectacular Now was the Closing Night presentation of the 2013 ATLFF.

Stella Meghie's debut feature Jean of the Joneses won the 2011 ATLFF Screenplay Competition and went on to be the first winning screenplay to be produced and play the festival. The film premiered at the 2016 South by Southwest Film Festival and then played ATLFF, with Meghie in attendance alongside stars Sherri Shepherd, Taylour Paige and Erica Ash.

Additionally, ATLFF has played the first works of Heidi Ewing, David Gordon Green, Reinaldo Marcus Green, Tina Mabry, Ray McKinnon, Victor Nuñez, Robert Rodriguez, RuPaul, David O. Russell and more.

Locations
Over the years, the festival's primary venues have included theaters such as Piedmont Park, High Museum of Art, Fox Theatre, Landmark Midtown Art Cinema, Atlantic Station Regal Cinemas, 7 Stages Theatre in Little Five Points and The Rialto Center for the Arts at Georgia State University. In 2013, ATLFF moved its principle screening operations to The Plaza Theatre in the Poncey-Highland neighborhood.

Midtown
In 2007, the festival partnered with the Landmark Midtown Art Cinema to centrally locate the festival to Midtown, dubbed the "Heart of Atlanta’s Arts" and home to a wide array of restaurants, bars and shops. The change allowed the festival more opportunities for panels, screenplay readings, film discussions and after-parties.

Highlands and Little Five Points
After 6 years centered at Landmark, the festival moved its home base to Atlanta's oldest continually operating cinema, The Plaza Theatre on Ponce de Leon Avenue, and added 7 Stages Theatre as a secondary venue. Taking advantage of the Poncey-Highland and Little 5 Points areas, the change pushed the event to be more of a walkable festival. The move was praised by locals and introduced out-of-town guests to Atlanta's unique neighborhoods. In the years since, ATLFF has reactivated the historic Hilan Theatre on North Highland Avenue in Virginia-Highland and incorporated several local landmarks as venues, such as The Highland Inn & Ballroom, The Church at Ponce & Highland, Ponce City Market, The Hotel Clermont and Dad's Garage Theatre Company.

Programming

On Average, ATLFF programs between 150 and 250 films from approximately 50 countries each year. For the 2020 Film Festival, ATLFF received 8,559 works submitted for consideration. On average, 85-95% of each year's film program comes from submissions, which special tracks designated for women filmmakers (New Mavericks), Black filmmakers, LGBTQ content (Pink Peach), Latin American content and Georgia-tied content.

ATLFF Screenplay Competition and Screenwriter's Retreat
Since 2008, ATLFF has hosted an annual Screenplay Competition that attracts over 1,300 submissions each year. Three feature film screenwriter winners attend a 3-day Screenwriter's Retreat at Serenbe where professional mentors help them workshop their scripts and get ready for the next stages of production. Winning screenplays also are featured at the festival in a staged table read. Additional prizes are also offered to winning episodic and short film scripts.

Out on Film and Pink Peach
For years the Atlanta Film Festival organization produced Atlanta's Out on Film gay film festival. In the Fall of 2008 the Atlanta Film Festival gave Out on Film to the LGBTQ community. Out on Film became an independent, 501(c)(3) gay/lesbian operation. Since 2008, the festival has included the Pink Peach track, highlighting LGBTQ films and filmmakers.

From 2008 to 2015, there was a Pink Peach Jury Award annually given to a feature film. Since 2016, LGBTQ films in competition are considered for the general jury prizes.

New Mavericks
In 2013, the festival featured a shorts block titled New Mavericks, featuring films by female filmmakers with strong female leads. This began an annual tradition and in 2015, the New Mavericks program was expanded to include feature films and an annual New Mavericks prize.

SOUND+VISION
In 2012, the festival partnered with the Goat Farm Arts Center and indieATL to introduce a special, mostly-outdoor event featuring music videos, art installations and live musical performances called SOUND+VISION. The evening is an example of the types of elements film festivals continue to add as they look to redefine themselves, connect with audiences and innovate. An estimated 1,200 people attended in its inaugural year, dropping to just under 800 in 2013, due to inclimate weather. In 2014, the event drew over 1,500 attendees, and eclipsed 3,000 attendees in 2015. In 2016, the event moved to Ponce City Market and again to 787 Windsor in 2017. After a year break, SOUND+VISION returned and took place on the BeltLine and in Historic Fourth Ward Park in 2019.

Individual Award Recipients
IMAGE Film Award
 Gary Moss (2001)
 Gayla Jamison (2001)
 Zell Miller (2001)
 Crawford Communications (2001)
 Victor Nunez (2002)
 Jim McKay and Michael Stipe (2002)
 PC&E (Production Consultants and Equipment) (2002)
 Eleanor Ringel Gillespie (2002)
 Ossie Davis (2003)
 Ruby Dee (2003)
 Burt Reynolds (2003)
 Parker Posey (2003)
 Georgia Office of Film, Video and Music (2003)
 Digital Projection (2003)
 Dallas Austin (2004)
 Diane Ladd (2004)
 Lon Slack (2004)
 Bill VanDerKloot (2004)
 Linda Dubler (2004)
 Dr. Herbert Eichelberger (2005)
 George King (2005)
 W. Bruce Harlan (2005)
 Guy H. Tuttle (2005)
 Katherine Evans (2005)
 Linda Burns (2005)
 Dr. Kay Beck (2006)
 George LeFont (2006)
 Lab 601 (2006)
 Will Packer (2007)
 Kenny Blank (2007)
 GPP (Georgia Production Partnership) (2007)
 Steve James and Peter Gilbert (2008)
 Tyler Perry Studios (2008)
 Dr. Matthew Bernstein (2008)
 Virginia Hepner (2008)
 Tom Luse (2019)
 Betsy Holland (2019)
 Christopher M. Carr (2019)
 T.I. (2019)
 Daveed Diggs (2019)
Southeastern Media Award
 Eric Wise; City Boys Dream of Beaches (1995)
 Dorne M. Pentes; The Closest Thing to Heaven (1996)
 Robert Clem; Big Jim Folsom: The Two Faces of Populism (1997)
 Nick Searcy, Sean Bridgers; Paradise Falls (1998)
 Michael Porembski; Burning Questions (1999)
 David Gordon Green; George Washington (2000)
 Ray McKinnon; The Accountant (2001)
 Kristen McGary, Amy McGary; The Adventures of Ociee Nash (2002)
Ossie Davis Award
 Spike Lee (2005)
 Cicely Tyson (2006)
 John Sayles, Maggie Renzi (2007)
Filmmaker-to-Watch Award
 Sean Bloch (2006)
 Julien Paolini (2013)
 Moon Molson (2014)
 Ian Samuels (2015)
 Thoranna Sigurdardottir (2016)
 Malcolm Washington (2017)
 Connor Simpson (2018)
 Kalu Oji (2019)
 Esteban Bailey (2022)
New Mavericks Award
 Meryem Benm'Barek-Aloïsi; Jennah (2015)
 Erica Tremblay; In the Turn (2015)
 Elisa Paloschi; Driving with Selvi (2016)
 Katy Grannan, Hannah Hughes; The Nine (2017)
Innovator Award
 Daveed Diggs (2018)
Phoenix Award
 Kiersey Clemons (2018)
 George Anthony Morton (2022)
Rebel Award
 Jason Reitman (2018)
 President Jimmy Carter (2021)
Originator Award
 Joe Berlinger (2019)
 Spike Lee (2019)

Notable films that have played the festival

Feature Film Award-Winners

See also
Sundance Film Festival
SXSW Film Festival
Nashville Film Festival
Atlanta Jewish Film Festival
List of film festivals
List of film festivals in North and Central America

References

External links
Atlanta Film Festival website
Film Freeway

Film festivals in Georgia (U.S. state)
Festivals in Atlanta
Annual events in Georgia (U.S. state)
Film festivals established in 1976
1976 establishments in Georgia (U.S. state)
Short film festivals in the United States
LGBT events in Georgia (U.S. state)
LGBT film festivals in the United States
Tourist attractions in Georgia (U.S. state)
Tourist attractions in Atlanta
Tourist attractions in Fulton County, Georgia